Flandreau School District 50-3 , also known as Flandreau Public Schools, is a school district headquartered in Flandreau, South Dakota.

It operates an elementary school, a middle school, and a high school.

History

In 2018 the district approved a budget.

In November 2020, during the COVID-19 pandemic in South Dakota, the district began requiring all students to do online learning.

Athletics
In 2018 it began a wrestling cooperative with Colman-Egan High School.

References

External links
 Flandreau Public Schools
Moody County, South Dakota
School districts in South Dakota